
Common Hardware Reference Platform (CHRP) is a standard system architecture for PowerPC-based computer systems published jointly by IBM and Apple in 1995.  Like its predecessor PReP, it was conceptualized as a design to allow various operating systems to run on an industry standard hardware platform, and specified the use of Open Firmware and RTAS for machine abstraction purposes.  Unlike PReP, CHRP incorporated elements of the Power Macintosh architecture and was intended to support the classic Mac OS and NetWare, in addition to the four operating systems that had been ported to PReP at the time (Windows NT, OS/2, Solaris, and AIX).

CHRP did not receive industry-wide adoption, however. The only systems to ship with actual CHRP hardware are certain members of IBM's RS/6000 series running AIX, and small amount of Motorola PowerStack workstations. Mac OS 8 contains support for CHRP and New World Power Macintosh computers are partially based on CHRP and PReP.

Power.org has a new Power Architecture Platform Reference (PAPR) that provides the foundation for development of Power ISA-based computers running the Linux operating system. The PAPR was released fourth quarter of 2006.

See also
 OpenPIC and IBM MPIC

References

 CHRP Specification Version 1.0 and related documents
 The PowerPC (TM) Hardware Reference Platform, an overview of CHRP
 
 PREP / CHRP / ofppc / macppc confusion on NetBSD port-powerpc mailing list.

External links
 penguinppc.org description of CHRP
 FirmWorks CHRP page
 Motorola StarMax 6000 at Low End Mac, A CHRP machine that never shipped.

PowerPC mainboards
IBM computer hardware